British Afghans are British citizens and non-citizen residents born in or with ancestors from, Afghanistan, part of worldwide Afghan diaspora. The Office for National Statistics (ONS) estimates that there were 79,000 people born in Afghanistan living in the UK in 2019.

History

Historical migration 
The first Afghan immigrants to the British capital were students, businesspeople and Afghan government officials. It wasn't until years later that significant numbers came in the form of refugees. The first large wave of Afghan immigrants to the UK were political refugees fleeing the 1980s communist regime and numerous others came in the early 1990s escaping Mujahideen. The number skyrocketed later that decade due to the rise of the Taliban in Afghanistan.

Some British Afghans may have probably come from the North-West Frontier Province (NWFP) of British India before the declaration of Pakistan, as such subsequent people from NWFP became recognised as Pakistanis.

Refugees of war and asylum policies 
As stated earlier, one of the large flows of Afghans to the UK was caused by refugees fleeing Afghanistan after the Taliban came to power. The country has been in a state of political unrest ever since. Despite the flow of immigrants and refugees remaining fairly stable over the new millennium period, the number of Afghans coming to the UK since the mid-2000s has completely eclipsed the recorded number of Afghans in the 2001 census, as more and more are fleeing the threat of violence and even death in their homeland during the War in Afghanistan. In 2003, the British government announced that they would begin enforced repatriation of failed asylum-seekers in April. This marked a break from the previous policy, observed continuously since 1978, of not returning any Afghans to their country of origin whether or not they were deemed to be economic migrants. At the time, roughly 700 Afghans applied for asylum in the United Kingdom each month, making them one of the largest group of asylum-seekers along with Iraqis.

Between 1994 and 2006, around 36,000 Afghans claimed asylum in the UK. Many whose claims were refused have not returned to Afghanistan, although the International Organization for Migration has helped some voluntarily return. 5,540 Afghan nationals were granted British citizenship in 2008, down from 10,555 in 2007.

Following the completion of the withdrawal of United States troops from Afghanistan in August 2021, the UK government launched the Afghan Citizens Resettlement Scheme (ACRS) in January 2022, to provide resettlement in the UK for Afghans who had worked for or were linked to the British government's presence in the country. In early December 2022, it was revealed that no Afghan had yet been resettled under the ACRS.

Demography 
The 2001 census recorded 14,875 Afghan-born people residing in the UK. The 2011 census recorded 62,161 people born in Afghanistan living in England, 562 in Wales, 737 in Scotland and 36 in Northern Ireland. The Office for National Statistics estimates that, by 2019, the Afghan-born population of the UK had risen to 79,000. About 49% are British nationals.

A number of unofficial population estimates have been made. Ethnologue estimates that there are 75,000 native Northern Pashto speakers in the UK, although these may comprise persons of other nationalities as well as Afghans. The number of Pashtuns in the UK is estimated at 100,000, forming the largest community of Pashtuns in the West, and the majority of Afghan Muslims in the UK are of Pashtun origin, however most British Pashtuns are of Pakistani Pashtun heritage. Other sources have put the Afghan population in London alone at 45,000 (2008) and 56,000. whilst the Afghan Association of London estimates that the population of Afghans in the whole UK stands at 70,000 (2009). The International Organization for Migration conducted a mapping exercise in 2006, suggesting that the Afghan population of the UK was 20,000.

Language
Most Pashtuns who originate from Afghanistan use Pashto in addition to English, with Dari (Afghan Persian) as a third language. Tajiks use Persian while Hazaras use Hazaragi, although some Tajiks and Hazaras are also fluent in Pashto. Pashto and Dari are both the official languages of Afghanistan.

Distribution 
At the 2001 census, about 70% of Afghans lived in the capital with largest concentration in western boroughs. At the 2011 census, there were 37,680 Afghan-born residents living in the region, 60% of the UK total. The largest population was London Borough of Ealing with 6,015 residents, and is followed by Hounslow (4,463), Brent (3,698), Harrow (3,314), Hillingdon (3,248) and Barnet (3,234), altogether forming almost two-thirds of the London community. The least-three boroughs were Bromley (115), Bexley (109) and Havering (53).

In 2001 the single largest Afghan community in the UK was West Southall, where 1,121 Afghan-born people and many more of Afghan descent live. The locations with the fewest Afghan-born residents are Northern Ireland and Wales, which as subdivisions are estimated to have no greater than 100 Afghan residents each.

The West Midlands has the second largest number of Afghans by county, with the larger communities in Birmingham (second highest city in the country), Coventry and Wolverhampton, and minor communities in Walsall. The West Midlands region had an Afghan population of 6,552 in the 2011 census, and the South East England region had 4,819. South West England and North East England both had the lowest in England each numbering less than one thousand. The number for Wales was 562.

Religion 

Most Afghans in the UK follow Sunni Islam although there is a significant number of Shias. There are also minorities of Sikh and Hindu Afghans in the Greater London area, with a particularly large Afghan Sikh community in the London Borough of Ealing, where 58% of Afghans are Muslims and a significant minority are Sikh in the 2001 census. In neighbouring Hounslow, 52% are Muslim, and in Hillingdon is 47%. By contrast, the Afghan population in Brent is over 90% Muslim. Islamic Afghan cultural centres are located in Willesden, Norbury and Hounslow.

One study of Afghan Muslims in England suggests that the majority are of Pashtun ancestry.

Economy and culture
Elonat is a Dari language advertising newspaper for the community. Community organisations include: the Afghan Council of Great Britain, the Afghanistan and Central Asian Association based in Feltham, the Afghan Association of London based in Harrow, and the Afghan Community Organisation of London based in Lewisham.

Notable individuals 
Idries Shah
Nelufar Hedayat
Maziar Kouhyar
Shabnam Nasimi
Aftab Sachak
Hammasa Kohistani
Aryana Sayeed

Peymana Assad became the first British citizen of Afghan origin to hold a London borough council seat when she was elected a councillor for Roxeth ward in the London Borough of Harrow in 2018. She ran as the Labour Party candidate for Ruislip, Northwood and Pinner constituency in the 2019 general election, losing to the Conservative candidate.

See also 
 Afghan diaspora
 Afghanistan–United Kingdom relations
 Afghan New Zealanders
 Afghan Australians
 Afghan Americans
 Afghan Canadians
 Afghans in France
 Afghans in the Netherlands
 Afghans in Germany
 Afghans in Denmark
 Afghans in Sweden
 Afghans in Norway

References

Further reading

External links 

 British Afghan Women
 Afghanaid – a British organisation/charity supporting Afghan children

Afghan diaspora in Europe
 
Immigration to the United Kingdom by country of origin